Interpretive (or Interpretative) journalism or interpretive reporting requires a journalist to go beyond the basic facts related to an event and provide more in-depth news coverage. The lack of precise borders accompanied with diverse theoretical approaches related to what interpretative journalism is in the modern world results in the practice of interpretative journalism overlapping with various other genres of journalism, and furthermore operationalization of interpretative journalism becomes largely blurred.  Interpretive journalists must have atypical awareness with and comprehension of a subject with their work involving looking for systems, rationale and influences that explain what they are reporting.

The impact of interpretive journalism is when the reporting results in trend-setting articles, powerful think-pieces and further straying into the field of investigative reporting which has become the hallmark of good print journalism. But in recent times with the trend of breaking news and in finding ways to get viewers faster, journalists as well as readers have given up or just don't find time for traditional long-form interpretive reporting.

Definitions 
 "It is reporting news depth and with care, news refreshed with background materials to make it comprehensive and meaningful. It is objective judgment based on background knowledge of a situation or appraisal of an event which are essential parts of news." - Lester Markel, editor, The Sunday New Yorks Times

 "It is giving the reading public accurate information as fully as the importance of any story dictates." - William Turner Catledge, editor, The New York Times"
 "It goes beyond the basic facts of an event or topic to provide context, analysis, and possible consequences." - Brant Houston, executive director, Investigative Reporters and Editors

History 
In his book Interpretative Reporting (1938) Curtis D. MacDongall wrote that during the beginning of the First World War most Americans were taken by surprise and were unable to understand the reasons why it started. This led to changes in the style of reporting.

During the 1920s events such as the Great Depression and the Nazi threat to global stability caused audiences to be no longer content with the five W's of journalism. In 1923, Time magazine launched as the first major publication to provide readers with a more analytical interpretation of the news. Many papers responded with a new type of reporting that became known as interpretive journalism.

The spread of interpretive reporting brought with it a number of variations such as new journalism, activism and advocacy journalism, adversary journalism, investigative journalism.

See also 
 Opinion Journalism
 Investigative Journalism

References

Further reading 
 Susana Salgado (29 May 2019). Interpretive Journalism. Oxford Bibliographies Online.
 

Journalism
Types of journalism